25B-NBOMe (NBOMe-2C-B, Cimbi-36, Nova, BOM 2-CB) is a derivative of the phenethylamine psychedelic 2C-B, discovered in 2004 by Ralf Heim at the Free University of Berlin. It acts as a potent full agonist for the 5HT2A receptor. Anecdotal reports from users suggest 25B-NBOMe to be an active hallucinogen at a dose of as little as 250–500 µg, making it a similar potency to other phenethylamine derived hallucinogens such as Bromo-DragonFLY. Duration of effects lasts about 12–16 hours, although the parent compound is rapidly cleared from the blood when used in the radiolabeled form in tracer doses. Recently, Custodio et al (2019) evaluated the potential involvement of dysregulated dopaminergic system, neuroadaptation, and brain wave changes which may contribute to the rewarding and reinforcing properties of 25B-NBOMe in rodents.

The carbon-11 labeled version of this compound ([11C]Cimbi-36) was synthesized and validated as a radioactive tracer for positron emission tomography (PET) in Copenhagen. As a 5-HT2A receptor agonist PET radioligand, [11C]Cimbi-36 was hypothesized to provide a more functional marker of these receptors. Also, [11C]Cimbi-36 is investigated as a potential marker of serotonin release and thus could serve as an indicator of serotonin levels in vivo. [11C]Cimbi-36 is now undergoing clinical trials as a PET-ligand in humans.

Toxicity and harm potential 

25B-NBOMe has been used in clinical trials with an evaluation dose for safety consideration to humans of only 1 microgram. Such a dose is only 1/300th the dose expected to be hallucinogenic to humans and it is expected that recreational use would greatly exceed doses determined to be safe to humans.  One case has been reported on where 25B-NBOMe was identified as the cause of death for a 17-year-old male. The drug was also implicated in the death of an 18-year old male, however it was not reported whether the presence of the drug was confirmed postmortem. Several deaths have been attributed to its close analogue 25I-NBOMe.

Analogues and derivatives

Legal status

Canada
As of October 31, 2016; 25B-NBOMe is a controlled substance (Schedule III) in Canada.

Russia
Banned as a narcotic drug since May 5, 2015.

Sweden
In Sweden, the Riksdag added 25B-NBOMe to schedule I ("substances, plant materials and fungi which normally do not have medical use") as narcotics in Sweden as of August 1, 2013,  published by the Medical Products Agency in their regulation LVFS 2013:15 listed as 25B-NBOMe 2-(4-bromo-2,5-dimetoxifenyl)-N-(2-metoxibensyl)etanamin.

United Kingdom

United States
In November 2013, the U.S. Drug Enforcement Administration placed 25B-NBOMe (along with 25I-NBOMe and 25C-NBOMe) in Schedule I of the Controlled Substances Act, making it illegal to manufacture, buy, possess, process, or distribute.

China
As of October 2015 25B-NBOMe is a controlled substance in China.

Czech Republic
25B-NBOMe is banned in the Czech Republic.

References 

2C (psychedelics)
Designer drugs
Bromoarenes
PET radiotracers